Saryg-Sep (Sarıg-Sep) is a rural locality (a selo) and the administrative center of Kaa-Khemsky District of Tuva, Russia. Population:

References

Notes

Sources

Rural localities in Tuva